This is a list of Monuments of National Importance (ASI) as officially recognized by and available through the website of the Archaeological Survey of India in the Indian state Goa. The monument identifier is a combination of the abbreviation of the subdivision of the list (state, ASI circle) and the numbering as published on the website of the ASI. 21 Monuments of National Importance have been recognised by the ASI in Goa.

List of monuments of national importance 

|}

See also
 List of State Protected Monuments in Goa
 Lists of Indian Monuments of National Importance

References

Goa
 National
Lists of tourist attractions in Goa
Buildings and structures in Goa